Iriéfla (also spelled Iréfla) is a town in central Ivory Coast. It is a sub-prefecture of Zuénoula Department in Marahoué Region, Sassandra-Marahoué District. The town is five kilometres south of the border of Woroba District.

Iriéfla was a commune until March 2012, when it became one of 1126 communes nationwide that were abolished.

In 2014, the population of the sub-prefecture of Iriéfla was 6,229.

Villages
The 4 villages of the sub-prefecture of Iriéfla and their population in 2014 are:
 Iriefla (3 011)
 Kaloufla (2 291)
 Toafla (589)
 Trabimenefla (338)

Notes

Sub-prefectures of Marahoué
Former communes of Ivory Coast